WISE J224607.57−052635.0 (or W2246−0526 for short) is an extremely luminous infrared galaxy (ELIRG) which, in 2015, was announced as the most luminous known galaxy in the Universe. The brightness is 350 trillion times that of the Sun (349×1012), and the merger of smaller nearby galaxies may be contributing to its brightness. The light is generated by a quasar 10 billion times the mass of the Sun. The optical and ultraviolet light emitted by the accretion disc around the quasar's supermassive black hole is absorbed by the galaxy's dust and remitted in the infrared. The galaxy releases 10,000 times more energy than the Milky Way galaxy, although WISE J224607.57–052635.0 is the smaller of the two. WISE J224607.57–052635.0 has a light-travel distance of 12.5 billion light years from it to Earth. The galaxy was discovered using the Wide-field Infrared Survey Explorer.

See also
 SDSS J0100+2802, hyperluminous quasar

References

External links 
 
 SDSS data and images
 Brightest Galaxy Video Scientific American 
  on SIMBAD
 

Galaxies
Aquarius (constellation)
?
WISE objects
Interacting galaxies
Luminous infrared galaxies